The 1953 New Jersey gubernatorial election was held on November 3, 1953. Incumbent Governor Alfred E. Driscoll was constitutionally prohibited from seeking a third term in office. Democratic former State Senator Robert B. Meyner defeated Republican businessman Paul L. Troast with 53.17% of the vote.

Primary elections were held on April 21, 1953.

Republican primary

Candidates
Malcolm Forbes, State Senator from Somerset County
Kenneth Hand, State Senator from Union County
Charles Richard Klein, senior guard at Rahway State Prison
Frederick F. Richardson, former Mayor of New Brunswick
Fred E. Shepard, State Assemblyman from Elizabeth
Paul L. Troast, businessman and chairman of the New Jersey Turnpike Authority
Alvin W. Van Schoick, Long Branch golf caddy

Campaign
The campaign was primarily a contest between businessman Paul Troast and State Senator and billionaire magazine publisher Malcolm Forbes. Troast campaigned on a platform of spending cuts and was considered the favorite by the final weeks of the campaign. He had the support of the Driscoll administration and virtually every major Republican leader, including 18 out of 21 county organizations, while Forbes ran as an outsider anti-administration candidate.

Results
Troast won handily. Forbes carried his home county of Somerset and native Passaic by large margins, but trailed nearly everywhere else.

Democratic primary

Candidates
Robert B. Meyner, attorney and former State Senator from Warren County
Alexander F. Ormsby, Jersey City attorney and former judge of the Court of Common Pleas	
Elmer H. Wene, chicken breeder, former U.S. Representative from Cumberland County, and nominee for Governor in 1949
John J. Winberry, Passaic attorney and former special assistant New Jersey Attorney General

Campaign
The primary campaign was a tight contest between the previous nominee, former Congressman Elmer H. Wene and former State Senator Robert B. Meyner. It was the first competitive Democratic primary for governor in at least 25 years. Meyner had the support of the state party establishment and a base in North Jersey, while Wene enjoyed an edge among rank-and-file voters and higher name recognition owing to his 1949 campaign.

The Democratic campaign was insurgent, with both front-runners focusing on gambling and criminal enforcement scandals in the incumbent Republican Driscoll administration.

Results
On election night, the results were inconclusive and neither candidate claimed clear victory; Meyner led by about 6,000, owing to a large margin in Hudson County, but most of the outstanding vote was from Wene's base in rural South Jersey. After Meyner was declared the victor following a recount, Wene refused to support him, calling the Jersey City results "questionable."

General election

Candidates
Henry B. Krajewski (Veterans Bonus Now)
Robert B. Meyner (Democratic)
Albert Ronis (Socialist Labor)
Clendenin Ryan (Independent Voters)
Paul L. Troast (Republican)

Campaign
The race received national attention as a test of the popularity of the new Dwight Eisenhower presidency, as the only other state election holding elections, Virginia, was safely Democratic.

Late in the campaign, Meyner suffered a setback when Democratic former Mayor of Jersey Frank Hague Eggers endorsed Troast over his opposition to current Mayor John V. Kenny, Meyner's chief backer. A week after that, Democratic runner-up and prior nominee Elmer H. Wene refused to support Meyner's candidacy, referring to the result in Jersey City, and therefore the primary overall, as "questionable." Though he did not endorse Troast, Wene said that "the election of a Democratic candidate would in truth be the election of Mayor Kenny and would destroy the integrity of our state government." State party chairman Charles R. Howell referred to Wene's statement as "pathetic" and accused Republicans of an alliance with former Democratic boss Frank Hague.

Results

References

1953
New Jersey
Gubernatorial
November 1953 events in the United States